Vallabhbhai is an Indian masculine given name that may refer to:

Vallabhbhai Kakadiya (born 1944), Indian politician
Vallabhbhai Kathiria (born 1954), Indian politician
Dahyabhai Vallabhbhai Patel (born 1945), Indian politician
Sardar Vallabhbhai Patel (1875–1950), Deputy Prime Minister of India
Sardar Vallabhbhai Patel Chowk
Sardar Vallabhbhai Patel National Memorial
Sardar Vallabhbhai Patel International Airport 
Sardar Vallabhbhai Patel Indoor Stadium
Sardar Vallabhbhai Patel Stadium, Ahmedabad 
Sardar Vallabhbhai Patel Stadium, Valsad
Sardar Vallabhbhai Patel International Hockey Stadium
Sardar Vallabhbhai Patel Institute of Technology
Sardar Vallabhbhai National Institute of Technology, Surat
Sardar Vallabhbhai Patel International School of Textiles & Management
Sardar Vallabhbhai Patel University of Agriculture and Technology
Sardar Vallabhbhai Patel Police Museum
Sardar Vallabhbhai Patel National Police Academy
Vallabhbhai Patel Chest Institute

Indian masculine given names